Progressive house is a subgenre of house music. The progressive house style emerged in the early 1990s. It initially developed in the United Kingdom as a natural progression of American and European house music of the late 1980s.

Etymology

In the context of popular music the word "progressive" was first used widely in the 1970s to differentiate experimental forms of rock music from mainstream styles. Such music attempted to explore alternate approaches to rock music production. Some acts also attempted to elevate the aesthetic values of rock music by incorporating features associated with classical instrumental music. This led to a style of music called progressive rock, which has been described as "the most self-consciously arty branch of rock."

In disco music, and later house music, a similar desire to separate more exploratory styles from standard approaches saw DJs and producers adopting the word "progressive" to make a distinction. According to the DJ and producer Carl Craig, the term "progressive" was used in Detroit in the early 1980s in reference to Italo disco. The music was dubbed "progressive" because it drew upon the influence of Giorgio Moroder's Euro disco rather than the disco inspired by the symphonic sound of Philadelphia soul. In Detroit, prior to the emergence of techno, artists like Alexander Robotnick, Klein + M.B.O. and Capricorn filled a vacancy left after disco's demise in America. In the late 1980s, UK music journalist Simon Reynolds introduced the term "progressive dance" to describe acts such as 808 State, The Orb, Bomb the Bass and The Shamen. Between 1990 and 1992, the term "progressive" referred to the short-form buzz word for the house music subgenre "progressive house".

History
Progressive house emerged after the first wave of house music. The roots of progressive house can be traced back to the early 1990s rave and club scenes in the United Kingdom. In 1992, Mixmag described it at the time as a "new breed of hard but tuneful, banging but thoughtful, uplifting and trancey British house." A combination of US house, UK house, Italian house, Polish house, German house, and techno largely influenced one another during this era. The term was used mainly as a marketing label to differentiate new rave house from traditional American house. Progressive house was a departure from the Chicago acid house sound. The buzz word emerged from the rave scene around 1990 to 1992, describing a new sound of house that broke away from its American roots. Progressive house was viewed by some as anti-rave as its popularity rose in English clubs while breakbeat hardcore flourished at raves. According to DJ Dave Seaman, the sound faced a backlash in the early 1990s because "it had gone the same way as progressive rock before it. Pompous, po-faced and full of its own self importance. But basically was really quite boring." The label progressive house was often used interchangeably with trance in the early years. The record label Bedrock Records released a series of "Bedrock’s ‘Compiled and Mixed’" albums featuring artists like Chris Fortier, John Creamer & Stephane K. Australian artist, Luke Chable has been known for his 2003 seminal remix release PQM’s "You Are Sleeping", titled "You Are Sleeping (Luke Chable Vocal Pass)".

AllMusic says that progressive house "led the increasingly mainstream-sounding house from the charts back to the dance floors".

Notable early productions
According to American DJ/producer duo Gabriel & Dresden, Leftfield's October 1990 release "Not Forgotten" was possibly the first progressive house production. The record label Guerilla Records, set up by William Orbit & Dick O'Dell, is thought to have been pivotal in the growth of a scene around the genre. Renaissance: The Mix Collection in 1994 and Northern Exposure in 1996 have both been credited with establishing the genre on mixed compilation albums. As well as Guerilla Records, the labels Deconstruction Records, Hooj Choons and Soma Records contributed to the scene's development in the early to mid-1990s.

In June 1992, Mixmag published a list that contained what the magazine viewed as the top progressive house tracks at that time.

 Leftfield - "Not Forgotten" (Outer Rhythm)
 Slam - "IBO/Eterna" (Soma Quality Recordings)
 React 2 Rhythm - "Whatever You Dream" (Guerilla)
 Soundclash Republic - Cool Lemon EP (Junk Rock Records)
 DOP - Musicians of the Mind EP (Guerilla)
 Gat Decor - "Passion" (Effective Records)

 The Sandals - "A Profound Gas" (Acid Jazz)
 Herbal Infusion - "The Hunter" (Zoom Records)
 Smells Like Heaven - "Londres Strut" (Deconstruction)
 Spooky - "Don't Panic" (Guerilla)
 Andronicus - "Make You Whole" (Hooj Choons)
 Sublime – "Sublime (Breakdown)" (Limbo Records)

Stylistic elements

According to Dave Seaman, house DJs who had originally played what was known as Eurodance borrowed from that the genre. This led to a commercial sound that people associate with progressive house today. Seaman notes that with the various lines between genres having become so blurred that true progressive house is often found "masquerading" as techno, tech house or even deep house. As such, the music can feature elements derived from styles such as dub, deep house and Italo house.

The progressive sound can be distinct from the later uplifting trance and vocal trance. It tends to lack anthemic choruses, crescendos and drum rolling, but holds an emphasis on rhythmic layers. Intensity is added by the regular addition and subtraction of layers of sound. Phrases are typically a power of two number of bars and often begin with a new or different melody or rhythm.

Later progressive house tunes often featured a build-up section which can last up to four minutes.  This is followed by a breakdown and then a climax. "Strobe" by Deadmau5 is a good example. Elements drawn from the progressive rock genre include the use of extended or linked-movement tracks, more complexity and reflection but almost always within the four on the floor rhythm pattern.

See also

 List of progressive house artists
 List of electronic music genres

References

 
House music genres
House
1990s in music
2000s in music
2010s in music
2020s in music
British styles of music